KHNE may refer to:

 KHNE-FM, a radio station (89.1 FM) licensed to serve Hastings, Nebraska, United States
 KHNE-TV, a television station (channel 28, virtual 29) licensed to serve Hastings, Nebraska